Bolon may refer to:
 Bolon, name of several gods in Mayan mythology
 Bolon (eyewear brand), a Chinese eyewear brand
 Bolon (flooring company), a flooring company in Sweden
 Bolon of Macedon (fl. 330 BC) soldier who gave a speech against Philotas, son of one of Alexander's generals
 Lake Bolon, in Russia's Khabarovsk Krai
 Bolon, ethnic group in Mali
 Bolon language, White Bolon and Black Bolon dialects, of the ethnic group in Mali
 Bolon (musical instrument), kind of harp found in Mali
 Comté de Bolon, old name for Boulon, Calvados, France

Surname and given name
The surname Bolon is relatively common in France. Also:
Andrew Bolon (c. 1826–1855), Indian agent whose murder triggered the Plateau Indian War
Linda Bolon (born 1948), member of the Ohio House of Representatives
Bolon B. Turner (1897–1987), Judge of the United States Tax Court

See also
 Bolón (disambiguation):
 :es:Bolón (Yucatán), in Umán Municipality, Mexico
 :es:Monte Bolón or Sierra de Bolón, in Valencia, Spain
 Bolón Ajau, waterfall with a fourteen-meter drop in Chiapas
 bolón de verde, Ecuadorian dish of roasted plantains, tacacho
 Bölön, old Hungarian name of Belin, Covasna
Bolan (disambiguation)